Grandma's Wedding is a 2019 Mexican romantic comedy film written and directed by Javier Colinas. The film stars Susana Alexander, Dino García and Luis Arrieta in the lead roles. It is a sequel to the 2015 film El cumple de la abuela (Grandma's Birthday). The film was predominantly shot in Cuernavaca, Morelos. The film was released on 11 October 2019 and received mixed reviews from critics. Most of the crew members who were part of the prequel were retained for the sequel. It was also streamed via Netflix on 5 February 2020.

Plot 
Grandma Abuela (Susana Alexander) has finally decided to marry a very younger gardener Julio (Dino García) in contrast to the age who for years has been the caretaker of her house in Cuernavaca. Although they do not agree with the situation, their families meet for a week to celebrate the marriage. Despite their multiple counts of differences, objections, and oppositions everyone attempts to bring the party in peace but this becomes much pathetic and complicated than thought before.

Cast 
 Susana Alexander as Abuela
 Dino García as Julio
 Luis Arrieta as Daniel
 Luis Ernesto Franco as Sebastián
 Antonio Gaona as Juan Pablo
 Armando Hernández as Rafael
 Paola Núñez as Andrea
 Renata Notni as Julieta
 Marimar Vega as Ana
 Tiaré Scanda as Diana
 Macaria as Aurora

References

External links 
 
 

2019 films
2010s Spanish-language films
Portuguese-language films
Mexican romantic comedy films
Spanish-language Netflix original films
Portuguese-language Netflix original films
2019 romantic comedy films
Films shot in Mexico
Mexican sequel films
2010s English-language films
2010s Mexican films